Filip Čech (born June 25, 1980 in Havířov) is a Czech professional ice hockey player. He played with HC Zlín in the Czech Extraliga during the 2010–11 Czech Extraliga season.

References

External links

1980 births
Czech ice hockey forwards
PSG Berani Zlín players
Living people
People from Havířov
Sportspeople from the Moravian-Silesian Region
VHK Vsetín players
HC Kometa Brno players